Asota paliura is a moth of the family Erebidae first described by Charles Swinhoe in 1893. It is found in China and Thailand.

The wingspan is about 61 mm.

References

Asota (moth)
Moths of Asia
Moths described in 1893